Vlado Janevski represented Macedonia in the Eurovision Song Contest 1998 after winning the national final selection with the song "Ne zori, zoro", which made altogether a country debut at the Eurovision Song Contest.

Before Eurovision

Skopje Fest 1998 
The final held on 7 March 1998 at the Universal Hall in Skopje accompanied by the big orchestra of MKRTV. Milanka Rašik and Aleksandar Delovski hosted the event, and the winner was selected by televoting for the first time.

At Eurovision 
Heading into the final of the contest, BBC reported that bookmakers ranked the entry joint 25th (last) out of the 25 entries. Vlado Janevski performed last in the running order on the night of the contest, following Turkey. "Ne zori, zoro" scored 16 points, finishing in 19th place out of 25 countries.

Macedonia gave the decisive points of the night: it was the last country to vote, and at that point, it was anyone's guess as to who was going to prevail, with Israel and Malta locked in battle and the United Kingdom just a few points behind. When Macedonia finally came to award the points, Israel was the first of the three contenders to be mentioned, receiving eight points. That was enough to knock the UK out of contention for victory, but left plenty of room for Israel to be overtaken by their principal rival, Malta. Next, the ten points went to the UK, nudging them into what looked like being an extremely fleeting spell in second place, since most of the audience assumed the twelve points were destined for Malta. Instead, there were gasps as Macedonia sent the final points of the evening to fellow Balkan nation Croatia, handing Israel the final victory.

Due to low placement Macedonia was relegated from the 1999 contest, but it would eventually return in 2000.

Voting

References

1998
Countries in the Eurovision Song Contest 1998
Eurovision